Bishopiella is a genus of flowering plants in the family Asteraceae.

There is only one known species, Bishopiella elegans, native to the State of Bahia in eastern Brazil.

References

Monotypic Asteraceae genera
Eupatorieae
Endemic flora of Brazil